When Easterly Showers Fall on the Sunny West (Traditional Chinese: 東山飄雨西關晴) is a Hong Kong TVB period drama series broadcasting from October till December 2008, starring Joe Ma and Charmaine Sheh as the main leads. The story takes place in the early 1930s in the city of Guangzhou (China) and revolves around the rich and prestigious Poon family.

Synopsis 
Chong Fung Yi (Liza Wang) abandoned her eldest son immediately after he was born because she didn't want to be labeled as the woman who gave birth before she was even married. However, her son Muk Hing (Joe Ma) manages to find his way back to her. Due to reputation purposes, she doesn't tell anybody about his true identity. Her younger son Cheuk Wah (Raymond Wong) falls in love with Yip Heung Ching (Charmaine Sheh), but because their different status' and Fung Yi's objection, they cannot be together. However, soon enough, Heung Ching and Muk Hing find themselves more than just friends... what obstacles will await them this time?

Main Cast

Recurring Cast

Other Cast

Viewership ratings

References 

TVB dramas
2008 Hong Kong television series debuts
2008 Hong Kong television series endings